Brighde Mullins is an American playwright and poet.

Biography
She graduated from the Yale School of Drama (Playwriting) and the Iowa Writers' Workshop of the University of Iowa (Poetry), with MFAs.

She taught at San Francisco State University, Brown University, Harvard University, CalArts, and currently teaches at University of Southern California where she is also the director of USC's Master of Professional Writing Program. In 2012, she was awarded a John Simon Guggenheim Memorial Foundation Fellowship.

She is a Usual Suspect at New York Theatre Workshop, and is a Core Member of the Playwrights' Center in Minneapolis. In 2014 she was awarded a residency at the Rauschenberg Foundation on Captiva Island.

Awards
 John Simon Guggenheim Memorial Foundation, 2012
 United States Artist Brooks Hopkins Fellowship, 2010
 The Will Glickman Award, 2002
 Whiting Award, 2001
 Jane Chambers Award, 1997
 NEA Fellowship, 1990

Residencies
 MacDowell Colony, 1999, 2002, 2004
 Mabou Mines, 2001
 Institute for Art and Civic Dialogue (with Anna Deavere Smith), 1999
 Lincoln Center, 1995, 1997
 New York Stage and Film, 1995
 Yaddo, 1999, 2004

Plays
 Pathological Venus, Ensemble Studio Theatre, New York, 1989 (published in )
 Increase, La MaMa, New York, 1990
 Meatless Friday, Women's Project, New York, 1993 (one-act play)
 Baby Hades (published in the Alaska Quarterly Review, Spring 1996
 Topographical Eden, Magic Theatre, San Francisco, 1997 (published in International Theatre Forum Issue 12)
 Monkey in the Middle, New York University, 1999 (published by Playscripts)
 Fire Eater, Tristan Bates Theatre, London, 1999
 Click, Humana Festival, Louisville KY, 2000
 Those Who Can, Do, Clubbed Thumb, New York, 2004 (published by Playscripts)
 Where Dante Would Put the Bush, Flea Theater, New York, 2004 (one-act play)

Poems

Dramaturgy
 "Next Year in Jerusalem", Visions and Voices by Stacie Chaiken University of Southern California, 2011
 Shakespearean Interpretation, Lincoln Center Theater, 2000

Anthologies

Essays

References

External links
"Oregon Shakespeare Festival"
"Brighde Mullins", doollee 
"Brighde Mullins", Playscripts bio
"USA Fellows bio"
"Dramaticules", personal blog
"USC Master of Professional Writing Program", faculty profile
"Brighde Mullins", company website
"Brighde Mullins in conversation with Lorrie Moore", audio recording
"Brighde Mullins in conversation with Jamaica Kincaid", ALOUD podcast
Profile and Production History at The Whiting Foundation

Year of birth missing (living people)
Living people
American dramatists and playwrights
Yale School of Drama alumni
Iowa Writers' Workshop alumni
San Francisco State University faculty
Brown University faculty
Harvard University faculty
California Institute of the Arts faculty
University of Southern California faculty
National Endowment for the Arts Fellows